Chamaraja may refer to names of many kings from Kingdom of Mysore.

Chamaraja Wodeyar I, Raja of Mysore (1408–1459; r. 1423–59)
Chamaraja Wodeyar II, Raja of Mysore (1463–1513; r. 1478–1513)
Chamaraja Wodeyar III, Raja of Mysore (1492–1553; r. 1513–53)
Chamaraja Wodeyar IV, Raja of Mysore (1507–1576; r. 1572–76)
Chamaraja Wodeyar V, Raja of Mysore (r. 1576–78)
Chamaraja Wodeyar VI, Raja of Mysore (1608–1637; r. 1617–37)
Chamaraja Wodeyar VII, Maharaja of Mysore (1704–1734; r. 1732–34). Son of Devaraj Urs of Ankanhalli.
Chamaraja Wodeyar VIII, Maharaja of Mysore (1759–1776; r. 1770–76)
Chamaraja Wodeyar IX, Maharaja of Mysore (1774–1796; r. 1776–96). Son of Sardar Devaraj Urs. of Arikuthara of the Karugahalli family. Interregnum: 1796–99
Chamaraja Wodeyar X, Maharaja of Mysore GCSI (1863–1894; r. 1868–94) m. Maharani Vani Vilasa Sannidhana Kempananja CI (1866–1934; Regent of Mysore: 30 December 1894 – 8 August 1902).
Rajkumar Bettada Chamaraja Wodeyar (1554–1639)
Jayachamaraja Wodeyar, Maharaja of Mysore GCB, GCSI (1919–1974; r. 1940–50; titular Maharaja and family head: 1950–71; head of the Wadiyar family: 1971–74)
Yaduveer Krishnadatta Chamaraja Wodeyar, Maharaja of Mysore (born 24 March 1992; head of the Wadiyar family: 2015–present). Adopted by Pramoda Kumari on 23 February 2015 and anointed on 28 May 2015).

Places 

 Chamaraja (Vidhana Sabha constituency), a constituency in Karnataka Legislative Assembly

Places named after Chamarajendra Wadiyar X 
 Chamaraja Road, Mysore, a road in Mysore
 Chamaraja Road, Vadodara, a road in Vadodara
 Chamaraja Road, a road in Vijayawada
 Chamaraja Road, a road in Srinivaspur

Indian masculine given names